Malachi railway station is located in the community of Malachi in Unorganized Kenora District in northwestern Ontario, Canada. The station is on the Canadian National Railway transcontinental main line, between Copelands Landing to the west and Ottermere to the east, has a passing track, and is used by Via Rail as a stop for transcontinental Canadian trains.

References

External links
 Malachi railway station

Via Rail stations in Ontario
Railway stations in Kenora District
Canadian National Railway stations in Ontario